Stenalia parvula is a beetle in the genus Stenalia of the family Mordellidae. It was described in 1967 by Ermisch.

References

parvula
Beetles described in 1967